The  is an electric multiple unit (EMU) train type operated by the private railway operator Fuji Kyuko (Fujikyu) on the Fujikyuko Line in Yamanashi Prefecture, Japan, since February 2012. A total of four three-car trains were introduced during fiscal 2011 and 2012, converted from former JR East 205 series EMU cars.

Design
Converted from former JR East 205 series EMU cars, the exterior and interior design of the 3-car 6000 series EMUs was overseen by industrial designer Eiji Mitooka. The second set to enter service, 6001, uses LED lighting throughout.

The first set, 6501, was converted from full-production 205 series cars constructed from 1985 to 1991, and has single-pane passenger windows, while subsequent sets (Set 6001 onwards) were converted from pre-production 205 series cars and have two-pane passenger windows which were originally from Yamanote Line from 1985 to 2005 and then Keiyo Line from 2005 to 2011.

Operations

Formation
The 6000 series are formed as 3-car sets as shown below, with car 1 at the Fujisan end. The first set in service, 6501, was converted from three cars of former Keiyo Line 205 series set KeYo 22. The second set, 6001, was converted from three cars of former Keiyo Line set KeYo 25. The fifth set, 6502, was converted from three cars of former Saikyo Line set Hae 28. The sixth set, 6701, was converted from three cars of former Hachiko Line set Hae 85.

The Mc cars are equipped with two FPS33E single-arm pantographs (only one normally used).

History

Conversion

The first set of three former Keiyo Line 205 series cars was transferred in unpainted form from JR East's Nagano Works to the Fujikyuko Line in October 2011. Modifications involved transplanting a driving cab onto a former intermediate motored car, the provision of LED destination indicators, and passenger-operated door buttons.

The second set (former Keiyo Line set KeYo 25) was transferred to the Fujikyuko Line in January 2012.

Driver training commenced in February 2012, with the units still in unpainted form.

Entry into service
The first set entered revenue service on 29 February 2012 (a date which can be read as fu-ji-kyu in Japanese). A formal debut event was staged on 18 March 2012, from which date, set 6501 also entered revenue service.

A further four former 205 series cars were purchased from JR East in November 2016.

Livery variations

In September 2016, set 6501 received a special red and white livery based on that of the Matterhorn Gotthard Bahn in Switzerland to mark the 25th anniversary of the signing of a sister railway agreement with the line.

References

Electric multiple units of Japan
Train-related introductions in 2012
1500 V DC multiple units of Japan